This is a list of notable Old Wesley Collegians, former students of Wesley College, Melbourne, Victoria, Australia.

Alumni of Wesley College are known as Old Collegians and are automatically members of the school's alumni association, the Old Wesley Collegians Association (OWCA), which was founded in 1882.

Academia, scholars, philosophers, clergymen and educators
 Samuel Alexander OM, British philosopher and the first Jewish fellow of an Oxbridge College
 Waleed Aly, lecturer at Global Terrorism Research Centre, School of Political & Social Inquiry, and at the Monash University Faculty of Arts; spokesman for the Islamic Council of Victoria; presenter on Network Ten's The Project
 The Hon. Chief Justice Michael Black AC QC, Barrister, Chief Justice of the Federal Court of Australia, Foundation Chairman of the Victorian Bar’s Readers Course, chair of the Advisory Committee (Juris Doctor Degree at the Melbourne Law School)
 Professor Geoffrey Blainey AC, historian
 Dr Andrew Dent AC, associate professor of medicine (Melbourne University)
 Professor Brian Lewis, Dean of the Faculty of Architecture (University of Melbourne)
 Professor John Henry Michell, mathematician and Senior Wrangler (Cambridge University)
 Professor Graham Oppy, philosopher (Monash University)
 Joseph Lade Pawsey, pioneer of the study of radio astronomy in Australia
 Lawrence Pyke, Rhodes Scholar, Headmaster of Newington College
 Sir David Rivett KCMG, Rhodes Scholar and associate professor and professor of chemistry (University of Melbourne)
 Walter Rosenhain, metallurgist
 Professor Chris Silagy AO, leading pioneer in evidence-based medicine
 Professor Warren Thomson OAM, Music (University of Sydney)
Sir Harold L. White CBE, Parliamentary Librarian of Australia and National Librarian
 Professor Carl Wood AC, CBE, FRCS, FRANZCOG; IVF pioneer (Monash University)

Business and sports administration
 Sir Frank Beaurepaire, founder of Beaurepaires and Olympic Tyres
 Sir John Grice, director of National Australia Bank (first Wesley student to qualify for entrance to University of Melbourne)
 Daryl Jackson AM, architect; chairman of the Australian Film Institute; trustee of NGV; vice president of Melbourne Cricket Club
 Poppy King, businesswoman; Young Australian of the Year 1995 (also attended Lauriston Girls' School)
 Eric McCutchan, manager of the Victorian Football League; inducted into the AFL Hall of Fame in 1996
 Ross Oakley, chief executive officer of the Australian Football League, Victorian Rugby Union, Melbourne Rebels and Royal Insurance, director of Harris Scarfe (1997–2001); chairman of the Royal Australian Holdings Ltd, the Royal Life Insurance Australia Ltd, the State Training Board of Victoria, the Get Going Sport Foundation; director of AAMI and Tisdall Wines; inducted into the AFL Hall of Fame in 2009
 Wayne Reid OBE, president of Tennis Australia
 Graeme Samuel AC, former chairman of the Australian Competition & Consumer Commission

Entertainment, media and the arts

Actors
 Laura Brent, actor
 Isabella Dunwill, actor
 William Franklyn, British actor
 Christopher Gabardi, actor
 Christopher "Kick" Gurry, Hollywood actor (star of Speed Racer, Looking for Alibrandi)
 Alan Hopgood, actor and dramatist
 Lachy Hulme, actor
 Samuel Johnson, actor, AFI recipient and Logies nominee, radio host (Nova FM)
 Lloyd Lamble (1934-2008), Australian and British film, theatre, radio and television actor
 Kyal Marsh, actor
 Eloise Mignon, actor (also attended St Michael's Grammar School, St Kilda)
 Chris Scalzo, actor
 Jason Stephens, actor
 Ashley Zukerman, actor
 Jane Harber, actor

Comedians
 Richard Stubbs, comedian

Musicians
 David Briggs, musician (Little River Band)
 Sophia Brous, musician, former program director of the Melbourne Jazz Festival and former curator of music at the Adelaide Festival
 Justine Electra, musician
 Paul Grabowsky, musician
 The Groop, 1960s rock band (original lineup)
 Louis Lavater (1867-1953) composer and author
 Ollie McGill, musician (keyboard player in The Cat Empire)
 The Temper Trap, band
 Bruce Watson, songwriter

Producers
 Malcolm Douglas, Australian wildlife documentary filmmaker and crocodile hunter

Radio and television
 Lloyd Lamble, radio announcer (3DB)
 Pete Smith, radio and television announcer
 Richard Stubbs, Melbourne ABC radio host
 Derek Guille, Musician and radio host

Other
 Charles Baeyertz, publisher of The Triad, critic and broadcaster
 Margaret Jane Gurney (born 1943), Australian artist (Methodist Ladies' College, Elsternwick)
 Barry Kay, stage and costume designer and photographer
 Frank Arthur Nankivell, artist
 Rohan Rivett, journalist and editor
 Athol Shmith, photographer
 John Spooner, political illustrator (The Age), 2002 winner of the Graham Perkin Award for the Australian Journalist of the Year
 Shura Taft, television and radio presenter
 Tom Wright, writer

Military
Victoria Cross recipients
 Captain Robert Cuthbert Grieve VC

Australian Army
 Major General Herbert William Lloyd CB CMG CVO DSO 
 Major General Edward Milford CB CBE DSO
 Major General George Vasey CB CBE DSO Bar
 Major General John Whitelaw AO CBE, son of Major General John Stewart Whitelaw
 Major General John Stewart Whitelaw CB CBE

Politics and government
 Kenneth Bailey
 James Bennett
 Russell Broadbent  Federal MP
 Ian Castles, Economist and Australian Statistician 
 Ian Cathie, Labor Victorian State Cabinet Minister
 Julian Hill, Federal MP
 Sam Cohen, Senator for Victoria
 Harold Edward Holt CH, Prime Minister of Australia
 Michael Kroger
 Major General Herbert William Lloyd CB, CMG, CVO, DSO
 Sam Loxton OBE
 Alexander Mair, Premier of New South Wales
John Maynard Hedstrom, member of the Legislative Council of Fiji
 Andrew McCutcheon, Labor Victorian State Cabinet Minister
 Sir Robert Gordon Menzies KT CH AK PC KC, Prime Minister of Australia
 Peter Nixon, National Party politician, Federal cabinet minister
Senator John Siddons, Australian Senator
 Bruce Arthur Smith
 Senator Reg Turnbull, Leader of the Australia Party
 William Henry Williams

Law 
 The Hon. Chief Justice Michael Black AC QC, Queen's Counsel
 Sir Robert Gordon Menzies KT CH AK PC KC, King's Counsul
 Stuart Morris QC, Queen's Counsel
 The Hon. Justice Geoffrey Nettle QC, Queen's Counsel, current Justice of the High Court of Australia
 Fred Whitlam, Australian Commonwealth Crown Solicitor (1936–1949); father of former Prime Minister of Australia Gough Whitlam
 The Hon. Philip Mandie QC, Justice of Victorian Court of Appeal (2009-2012) and of Supreme Court of Victoria (1994-2012)

Sciences, medicine and engineering
 Doctor Tony Atkins AM, medical practitioner recognised for his work in famine relief and agricultural development in Africa
 Professor Sir Robert Chapman CMG, first Professor of Physics and Engineering at Adelaide University
 Doctor Andrew Dent AM, medical doctor and humanitarian worker
 Professor Graham Farquhar 
 Doctor Alan William Greenwood CBE FRSE, zoologist and geneticist
 Charles Hoadley, geologist and Antarctic explorer
 Doctor John Orchard AM, sports and exercise medicine physician recognised for his work in cricket 
 Doctor Joseph Lade Pawsey, pioneer of the study of radio astronomy in Australia
 Sir David Rivett KCMG, chemist, chairman and chief executive officer of the CSIR and founder of the CSIRO
 Walter Rosenhain, metallurgist
 John Springthorpe, physician
 William Sutherland, physicist
 Sir George Adlington Syme, surgeon and first president of the Royal Australasian College of Surgeons
 Sir William George Dismore Upjohn, surgeon and chancellor of Melbourne University
 Professor Carl Wood AC CBE FRCS FRANZCOG, IVF pioneer, Monash University

Sport

Athletics
 Ted Best, Commonwealth Games track and field athlete  (1938)
 Emma Carney, World Cross Country Championships distance runner (1993, 1994)
 Clare Carney, World Cross Country Championships distance runner (1994)
 Dean Kenneally, Commonwealth Games track and field athlete  (1994)

Australian rules football
 Ross Abbey, Footscray Football Club
Ray Allsopp, Richmond Football Club
 Stuart Anderson, Fremantle Football Club and North Melbourne Football Club
 Simon Arnott, Geelong Football Club and Sydney Swans
 Darren Baxter, Hawthorn and Footscray
 James Bennett, Hawthorn Football Club
 Peter Bennett, St Kilda Football Club
 George Bickford, Melbourne Football Club
 Peter Box, Footscray Football Club and Brownlow Medalist
 Frank Boynton, Melbourne Football Club, Geelong Football Club and University Football Club
 Adam Cerra, Fremantle Football Club
 Arch Corbett, Melbourne University Football Club (VFL)
 Harry Curtis, Collingwood Football Club and Carlton Football Club
 Kate Dempsey, Richmond AFLW
 Jasmine Fleming, Hawthorn Football Club
 Sam Frost, Greater Western Sydney Giants and Melbourne Football Club
 Toby Greene, Greater Western Sydney Giants
 Warwick Green St Kilda Football Club
 Will Johnson, St Kilda Football Club
 Allan McKellar, Richmond and Sydney
 Stephen Mount, Richmond, 1980 premiership 
 Ross Oakley, St Kilda Football Club
 Roy Park, Melbourne Football Club and Melbourne University Football Club
 Arthur Pearce, St Kilda Football Club
 Pepa Randall, GWS AFLW
 Gordon Rattray, Fitzroy Football Club, Brighton Football Club; first to use the torpedo punt
 Les Reeves, North Melbourne Football Club
 Nick Ries, Hawthorn Football Club
 Elijah Tsatas, Essendon
 Ivor Warne-Smith, Melbourne Football Club, dual Brownlow Medallist
 Fergus Watts, Adelaide Crows Football Club

Baseball and basketball
 Michael Nakamura, Olympic athlete (1996, 2000) and Major League Baseball player

Cricket
 Ross Gregory, First Class cricketer for Australia and Victoria
Henry James Herbert "Tup" Scott (26 Dec 1858 – 23 Sept 1910) Australian Test Cricketer (Captain 1886)
 Ian Johnson CBE, Australian Test Cricketer (Captain 1956) and member of "The Invincibles"
 Sam Loxton, Australian Test cricketer (1948–1951)  and member of "The Invincibles"
 Dirk Nannes, First Class cricketer for Victoria
 Roy Park, First Class cricketer for Australia and Victoria
 Keith Rigg, First Class cricketer for Australia and Victoria
 Edward Rush,  First Class cricketer for Victoria
 Carl Willis, First Class cricketer for Victoria

Cycling
 Katie Mactier, track cycling Olympic silver medalist (2004), Commonwealth Games gold medalist (2006), and World Champion (2005)
Robert Crowe, 2004 World Record 4000m Tandem Pursuit with Kieran Modra (4mins 21.451)

Netball
Sharelle McMahon, Australian netball Captain, world champion (1995, 1999) and Commonwealth Games netballer (1998, 2002, 2006, 2010)
Molly Jovic

Rowing
 Paul Guest, three time Olympian rower and Family Court of Australia judge.
 Nicholas Lavery, Olympic men's eight Tokyo 2020.

Sailing
 Jesse Martin, youngest person to have circumnavigated the globe solo, non-stop and unassisted (age 17); Ambassador of Reach Young & Young Endeavour

Swimming
 Michael Klim OAM, Olympic gold medallist (1996, 2000, 2004), world record holder (1996–2000), Commonwealth Games athlete (1998, 2006) and Australian Representative (1996, 1997, 1998, 1999, 2000, 2001, 2002)

Triathlon
Emma Carney, Triathlon World Champion 1994, 1997 World Number 1 Triathlete (1995, 1996, 1997) Australian Representative (1994, 1995, 1996, 1997, 1998, 1999, 2000, 2001, 2002, 2003, 2004).  Emma also represented Australia in Athletics.

Tennis
 Mark Philippoussis, professional tennis player, runner-up at Wimbledon and US Open and Olympic athlete for tennis (1996, 2000, 2004)
 Christina Wheeler, member of the Federation Cup team (2001)

Water polo
 Peter Bennett, Olympic athlete (1952, 1956) and Commonwealth Games athlete (1950)

Other
 Curtis Good, footballer for Newcastle United
 Jack Hingert, footballer for Brisbane Roar in the A-League
 Mick Parker, mountaineer

References

Sources
 A brief history of Wesley College sport Wesley College, Melbourne (2006)
 Adamson Theatre Company Wesley College, Melbourne – Performing Arts, Season Brochures

External links
 Wesley College, Melbourne Website
 Old Wesley Collegians Association Website

Lists of people educated in Victoria (Australia) by school affiliation

Melbourne-related lists
 List